The Vancouver bridge arson attack took place on April 29, 1915, when two key bridges in the West Coast Canadian city of Vancouver, Granville Street Bridge and Connaught Bridge, were set on fire.

Background
The Connaught Bridge was completed in 1911 for $740,000, opening to traffic on May 24, 1911. The following year, Canada's Governor General, the Prince Arthur, Duke of Connaught and Strathearn, accompanied by the Duchess and their daughter, Princess Patricia, visited Vancouver to officiate at a ceremony renaming the new crossing as the "Connaught Bridge" on September 20, 1912. The name "Connaught" never caught on, and most people continued to call it simply the "Cambie Street Bridge", after the street that runs across it, Cambie Street, named for pioneer Vancouver resident Henry John Cambie.

Fire
The fires happened on April 29, 1915. The American media widely reported that the fires were set by German immigrants celebrating the Imperial German victory over the Canadians at Ypres, Belgium.  The fire on the caused a  span of the Connaught Bridge to collapse and caused about $90,000 in damage.

Arrests
Four Germans were arrested and interned Baron von Luttowitz (related to the Imperial German Kaiser), Dr. Otto Grumert, Paul Koop and Frederich Spritzel.

See also
1915 Vanceboro international bridge bombing
List of German sponsored acts of terrorism during WWI

Bibliography 
Notes

References 
 - Total pages: 882

Conflicts in 1915
1915 crimes in Canada 
Rail transport in British Columbia 
Disasters in British Columbia
History of British Columbia 
World War I spies for Germany
Acts of sabotage
Canada in World War I
Transportation disasters in British Columbia
1915 in rail transport
1915 in British Columbia
Terrorist incidents in the 1910s
Canadian home front during World War I
April 1915 events
Attacks on bridges
Terrorist incidents in Canada
Bridge disasters in Canada